Patrington is a village and civil parish in the East Riding of Yorkshire, England, in an area known as Holderness,  south-east of Hedon,  south-east of Kingston upon Hull and  south-west of Withernsea on the A1033. Along with Winestead, it was a seat of the ancient Hildyard/Hilliard/Hildegardis family.

The Prime Meridian passes just to the east of Patrington.

The civil parish is formed by the villages of Patrington and Winestead and the hamlet of Patrington Haven and at the 2011 census, had a population of 2,059, an increase on the 2001 UK census figure of 1,949.

RAF Patrington, built during the Second World War, was a radar station and used for ground-controlled interception. In 1955, following the building of a new RAF station at nearby Holmpton, the radar site closed, being surplus to requirements. The new radar site at Holmpton was later renamed RAF Patrington.

Patrington was served from 1854 to 1964 by Patrington railway station on the Hull and Holderness Railway.

St Patrick's Church is an example of the decorated period of Gothic architecture. Known as the "Queen of Holderness", it is a Grade I listed building. It contains an Easter Sepulchre.

Village amenities
The village has a central square of shops, known as the market place, which consists of a wide range of services for residents and is often used as a "stop-off" for drivers passing through the village going towards Withernsea or Easington. Shops and services include a general store, petrol station, hardware store, 4 bakeries and cafes, 4 public houses, a country house bed and breakfast, a fish and chip shop, pharmacy, 3 hair/beauty salons (4th to be opened soon to replace the Barclays bank), a country wear store, 2 florists/homemade gifts stores and the doctors surgery which forms part of the South Holderness Medical Practice. Alongside businesses, there is a football pitch adjacent to the playing fields and a cricket pitch opposite the primary school which holds regular tournaments with teams all over the country.

Notable people
Robert Thew (1758–1802), engraver

References

External links 

 
 
 

Villages in the East Riding of Yorkshire
Holderness
Civil parishes in the East Riding of Yorkshire